Jamal Mohamed College is a Government-aided and self-financed institution founded in 1951 by M. Jamal Mohamed Sahib and N.M. Khajamian Rowther. The college campus is located in Tiruchirappalli, India and is affiliated to Bharathidasan University. The Day session is for male students and Evening session is for female students.

History 
The college was started in 1951 and it was affiliated to University of Madras. Later, Since 1982 it is affiliated to Bharathidasan University.
The college is administered by the Society of Jamal Mohamed College. It is established in a sprawling land area of 87 acres, as a religious minority institution. Janab M. Jamal Mohamed Sahib and Janab N.M. Khajamian Rowther were the founding fathers of this institution and revered locally.

In the year 1957 the college got the single honor of being bracketed with the thirty best colleges in India when Dan forth Foundation of USA selected the college for the award of study fellowships in U.S.A. In 1963 the college was elevated to the status of a post-graduate college.

In the year 1972, the college was recognized by UGC New Delhi, for the purposes of Grants under section 2(F) and 12(B) of the University Grants Commission Act 1956. In 1977, on the recommendation of the University of Madras, the UGC recognized the college as one of the ten "Lead colleges" in the university area.

The college was accredited at Five Star Level by NAAC during 2002 and conferred with Autonomous Status by UGC, New Delhi and Bharathidasan University in 2004–2005. In January 2009, the college was accredited by NAAC with A-Grade (2nd Cycle) - CGPA 3.6 out of 4.0. Our College was bestowed with the unique honour of "CPE" status Phase-I and Phase-II by the University Grants Commission under the Scheme "Colleges with Potential for Excellence" in 2011 and 2016 respectively. We retained the ‘A’ Grade awarded by NAAC during the third cycle of accreditation in 2015.

The college is moving ahead with a sporting spirit by securing prestigious top rankings in the NIRF Assessment for the Higher Educational Institutions in India. The college has raised its status from 59th to 54thrank in the NIRF Ranking 2020. It is remarkable to state that the college has been recognized with Three Star status by the Institutions Innovation Council (IIC), MHRD innovation cell, Government of India in 2019. Department of Science and Technology (DST), Government of India has accorded FIST Scheme to the Departments of Zoology, Botany and Physics in 2004 and to the Department of Mathematics in 2008. Again DST FIST Scheme has been extended to the Departments of Mathematics, Physics, Chemistry, Botany, Zoology and Computer Science in 2019. Five Science Departments viz. Mathematics, Physics, Chemistry, Botany and Zoology have been awarded the Star College Scheme by the Department of Bio Technology (DBT) in 2020.

Over a period of 70 years the college was able to scale greater heights and raise to the present status as a multi-faculty institution with 23 UG and 20 PG programmes. 19 departments of the college are functioning with the status of approved research centres. The college has a strength of around 12,000 students. There are 145 Government Aided teaching faculty and 354 staff members are working under the self-finance stream. The college celebrated its silver Jubilee in 1971, subsequently the Golden Jubilee and Diamond Jubilee in 2001 and 2011 respectively.
 
With many milestone achievements, the college has been marching towards fulfilling marvelous plans, matching the vision and mission of our noble founders and the present Management Committee Members. “The Jamal” journey continues with all gentle Jamalians towards the greater heights of glory in higher education.

Emblem and motto
The emblem of the college consists of a shield divided into four parts with a circle in the middle. On the top left, there is a crescent and a star, a symbol of Islamic culture and faith in future prosperity. On the right, there is an open book symbolizing knowledge. At the bottom right, there is a lotus, the symbol for purity and prosperity. The bottom left represents a replica of Golden Rock standing for strength and striving. Inset in the mid-circle is the frontage of the college main building with a dome and minarets representing the essence of Islamic culture: The present is a preparation for the Hereafter. Underneath the shield is a ribbon containing a verse from the Quran in Arabic script followed by its translation in English that reads: 'Show us the right path', which is the motto of the college.

Thus the emblem of Jamal enshrines the ideals of cultural integration and guidance of learning and striving to succeed in the Here and the Hereafter, tempered with constant prayers to the Almighty to guide us on the straight path. The four figures in the shield are diagonally placed with green and yellow backgrounds, stranding prosperity and happiness.

Academics

The college was able to become a multi-faculty institution with 11 UG programmes, 11 PG programmes and 2 M.Phil. Programmes under Government Aided stream and 11 U.G. programmes, 13 P.G. programmes, 17 M.Phil. and 16 Ph.D. programmes under self financing stream for men by promoting quality and excellence in higher education due to the sustained efforts and dedicated leadership given by the College Management Committee. The college also offers 13 U.G., 14 P.G. programmes, 16 M.Phil. and 15 Ph.D. programmes exclusively for women as part of women empowerment during the second shift of the college. During 2021–22, the college offers 23 Under Graduate, 20 Post Graduate, 7 UGC Sponsored Career-Oriented programmes, 17 M.Phil. and 16 Ph.D., programmes. The present student strength is around 12,000, of which 4605 are women students. There are about 494 Teaching and 297 Non-teaching staff.

Admission

Programmes

UG Programmes
Admissions shall be made on the basis of the marks obtained in the +2 Examination.

PG Programmes
Admissions shall be made on the basis of the marks obtained in the qualifying Degree Examination.

MCA Programmes
Number of Seats : Government Aided Programme - 60 | Self-Finance Programme - 60

Admissions shall be made on the basis of the marks obtained in the qualifying Degree Examination
The scores obtained in TANCET conducted by the Anna University, Chennai.

MBA Programmes
Number of Seats : Self-Finance Programme - 120

Admissions shall be made on the basis of the marks obtained in the qualifying Degree Examination
The scores obtained in TANCET conducted by the Anna University, Chennai.
Performance in the Group Discussion & Interview (Conducted in the college)

M.Phil. Programmes (Full-Time & Part-Time)
Admissions shall be made on the basis of the marks obtained in the qualifying Post Graduate Degree Examination.
The marks obtained in the Entrance Test and Interview conducted in the college.

Ph.D. Programmes (Full-Time & Part-Time)
Admissions to the Ph.D. programmes are made based on the regulations of the Bharathidasan University, Tiruchirappalli.

Full-time Ph.D. Programmes are offered for Men candidates only.

Environment 
 Holisitc learning environment
 Well equipped infrastructure and learning facility
 ICT enabled spacious class rooms and state of the art laboratories
 Adorable and safe hostel facility for both men and women students
 Air-Conditioned auditorium with a seating capacity of 1000 people
 WiFi enabled campus
 Purified drinking water facility using reverse osmosis technique
 Uninterrupted powersupply
 Well-equipped Gymnasium and Health Care Centres
 Modern Multipurpose Indoor Stadium and a vast play ground for promoting sports and games
 Huge General Library and department libraries with rare collection of books and study materials
 Student friendly photocopy centre (Xerox)
 Affordable cafeteria and well-maintained dining area
 Vast two wheeler and four wheeler parking facility
 Bus facility and Day Care Centre for women students

Highlights 
 71st Year of Service in Higher Education
 An Autonomous College with Potential for Excellence
 DBT-Star College Scheme and DST-FIST Funded College
 Unique history of academic and extra academic performance marching towards excellence
 Diversified UG, PG and Research Programmes under Aided and Unaided streams
 25 UG, 20 PG and 19 Research Programmes leading to M.Phil. and Ph.D
 Offering both conventional and innovative programmes like Commerce, Information Technology, Biotechnology, Hotel Management, Fashion Technology & Costume Designing, Nutrition & Dietetics, MBA, MCA, MSW etc
 Continuously securing University Ranks in all major disciplines every year
 Qualified, experienced and well-trained teaching faculty members
 Enriched and updated curriculum with Value Added Course
 Deeniyath and Value based Moral Education
 Career Guidance, Counselling and Placement assistance
 Intensive Civil Services Coaching facilities for all UPSC Examinations leading to become IAS, IPS, IRS and IFS officers
 Multi-Skill development programmes for overall development of personality
 15 Extension and Extra-Curricular activities to inculcate Social responsibility
 Extending valuable service under Unnat Bharat Abhiyan Scheme to help local community
 Exclusive Innovation & Incubation Centre functions for promoting entrepreneurial skills
 No Capitation Fee / Donation for admission
 Identified by MHRD and UGC, New Delhi as an institution to be granted with Degree Awarding Status

References

External links 

 

Islamic universities and colleges in India
Universities and colleges in Tiruchirappalli
Educational institutions established in 1951
1951 establishments in Madras State
Colleges affiliated to Bharathidasan University
Academic institutions formerly affiliated with the University of Madras